"Better Than I Used to Be" is a song written by Ashley Gorley and Bryan Simpson. The song was originally recorded by American country music artist Sammy Kershaw in 2010 for the album of the same name, released August 31, 2010, on Big Hit Records. The version released by Sammy Kershaw was released as a single, but did not enter the charts.

Tim McGraw version

The song was later covered by Tim McGraw in 2011 and was released to iTunes and country radio on December 1, 2011, via Curb Records. The song served as the first single for his final Curb album, Emotional Traffic, which was released on January 24, 2012.

Critical reception
Giving McGraw's version four stars out of five, Taste of Country reviewer Billy Dukes said, "It's the first time fans get to experience many of the burdens the singer has talked of shedding in recent years." Matt Bjorke of Roughstock was positive, calling it "a strong story song from a mature singer/songwriter." He went on to say that it was McGraw's "most country song to date with strong lyrical imagery and one of Tim’s best vocal performances in years." Kevin John Coyne of Country Universe gave it a 'B+', calling the song "classic McGraw" and saying that the production is, "clean, tasteful, and decidedly country."

Chart performance 
McGraw's version of the song debuted at number 51 on the U.S. Billboard Hot Country Songs chart for the week of December 17, 2011. It also debuted at number 81 on the U.S. Billboard Hot 100 chart for the week of December 31, 2011. It also debuted at number 71 on the Canadian Hot 100 chart for the week of February 11, 2012.

Year-end charts

Certifications

References 

2010 singles
2011 singles
Sammy Kershaw songs
Tim McGraw songs
Song recordings produced by Buddy Cannon
Song recordings produced by Byron Gallimore
Song recordings produced by Tim McGraw
Songs written by Ashley Gorley
Songs written by Bryan Simpson
Curb Records singles
2010 songs